Emmanuel Augusto Nery commonly known as Nery, (25 December 1892 - 5 November 1927) was a Brazilian football player. He was a member of the Brazilian squad at the 1916 Copa America, helping them finish third and win the bronze medal.

Career
Nery started his career from Fluminense in 1910 and two years later he moved to crosstown rivals Flamengo where he played until 1919. He won the Campeonato Carioca 3 times and featured in the first official match of the Brazil national football team against Exeter City in 1914..He died in Rio de Janeiro in 1927, at the age of 36.

Honours

Club
 Campeonato Carioca: 1911, 1914, 1915

National team
Roca Cup:1914

References

External links
 Profile on Zerozero
 Profile on Sport.de
Profile on NFT

1892 births
1927 deaths
Footballers from Rio de Janeiro (city)
Brazilian footballers
Brazil international footballers
Fluminense FC
CR Flamengo
Association football defenders